James Lee Rogers (born June 29, 1955) is a former American football running back who played five seasons with the New Orleans Saints of the National Football League. He played college football at the University of Oklahoma and attended Forrest City High School in Forrest City, Arkansas. He was also a member of the Edmonton Eskimos of the Canadian Football League.

College career
Rogers played for the Oklahoma Sooners from 1974 to 1978.

Professional career
Rogers spent the 1979 season on the Edmonton Eskimos' practice roster. The Eskimos won the 67th Grey Cup against the Montreal Alouettes on November 25, 1979.

Rogers played in 72 games, starting ten, for the New Orleans Saints from 1980 to 1984. He was the Saints' leading rusher with 366 yards in 1980 and also the team's leading kickoff returner with 930 yards.

References

External links
Just Sports Stats
College stats

Living people
1955 births
Players of American football from Arkansas
American football running backs
African-American players of American football
Oklahoma Sooners football players
New Orleans Saints players
People from Forrest City, Arkansas
21st-century African-American people
20th-century African-American sportspeople